Canal+ Décalé was a French pay-television channel. Part of Canal+, "Décalé'" means 'staggered', and was an overflow network carrying mainly event programming which could not be contained to Canal+'s regular networks, along with replays of that programming.

History
Canal+ Bleu launched on 27 April 1996, on satellite and cable as a programme multicast of Canal+ films.

As part of the creation of the Canal+ Bouquet, the channel changed its name on 1 November 2003 to Canal+ Confort. It changed to its present name on 2005 to become Canal + Décalé.

The channel started broadcasting its programmes in high definition on 12 October 2010.

Canal+ Décalé is used for pop-up channels for many events, like Canal+ Rio 2016 (in the 2016 Olympic Games) and Canal+ Tennis (every year for the BNP Paribas Masters).

On 29 August 2022, Canal+ Décalé was closed down and replaced by Canal+ Sport 360 two days later.

See also
 Canal+
 Canal+ Séries
 Canal+ Family
 Canal+ Sport
 Canal+ Cinéma

References

External links
 Official website

Television stations in France
Defunct television channels in France
Décalé
Television channels and stations established in 2005
Television channels and stations disestablished in 2022
2005 establishments in France
2022 disestablishments in France